The 2003 AMA National Speedway Championship Series was staged over two rounds, which were both held at Auburn on July 25 and September 26. Greg Hancock won the title for the fourth time, his first since 2000.

Event format 
Over the course of 20 heats, each rider raced against every other rider once. The field was then split into sections of four riders, with the top four entering the 'A' Final. Points were then awarded depending on where a rider finished in each final. The points in the 'A' Final were awarded thus, 20, 18, 16 and 14. Bonus points for were also awarded.

Classification 

 Greg Hancock beat Ryan Fisher in a run-off to claim the title.

References 

AMA
United States
Speed
Speed